Felipe "Pipe" Sáez Carrillo (born 19 August 1995) is a Spanish former footballer who played as a left-back.

Career
At the age of 16, Sáez joined the youth academy of Real Madrid, from Rayo Vallecano. In 2014, he signed for UD San Sebastián de los Reyes in the Spanish fourth division, helping them earn promotion to the Spanish third division.

Jn 2017, he signed for the reserves of Spanish La Liga side Rayo Vallecano. In 2019, Sáez returned to Sanse in the Spanish third division.

Before the 2021 season, he signed for Finnish team HIFK. On 6 February 2021, Sáez made his debut for HIFK in a 1-0 win over KTP, and scored his first goal for the club during the same match. On 17 July 2022 HIFK announced that Sáez decided to retire as a football player and become a teacher.

References

External links
 Real Madrid profile
 
 

1995 births
Footballers from Madrid
Living people
Spanish footballers
Association football defenders
Real Madrid C footballers
UD San Sebastián de los Reyes players
Rayo Vallecano B players
Las Rozas CF players
HIFK Fotboll players
Segunda División B players
Tercera División players
Veikkausliiga players
Spanish expatriate footballers
Expatriate footballers in Finland
Spanish expatriate sportspeople in Finland